Centranthera is a genus of plants in the family Orobanchaceae. The genus is distributed in Asia. There are about 10 species in this genus, and the majority have funnel-shaped flowers. In Nepal, Centranthera cochinchinensis is reportedly used an alternate fodder.

Species
Species accepted by the Plants of the World Online as of November 2022:
Centranthera brunoniana 
Centranthera chevalieri 
Centranthera cochinchinensis 
Centranthera grandiflora 
Centranthera hispida 
Centranthera hookeri 
Centranthera indica 
Centranthera nepalensis 
Centranthera rubra 
Centranthera siamensis 
Centranthera tranquebarica

Other uses
The name Centranthera Scheidw. 1842 is an invalid name for the orchid genus Pleurothallis.

References

Orobanchaceae
Orobanchaceae genera
Taxa named by Robert Brown (botanist, born 1773)